Shore Acres is a 1914 American silent drama film directed by Jack Pratt and starring Charles A. Stevenson, Riley Hatch and Conway Tearle. It is based on the 1893 play Shore Acres by James A. Herne, later also adapted into a 1920 film of the same title.

Cast
 Charles A. Stevenson as Nathaniel Berry
 Riley Hatch as Martin Berry 
 Conway Tearle as Sam Warner
 Edward Connelly as Josiah Blake 
 Violet Horner as Helen Berry
 Gladys Fairbanks as Ann
 Harry Knowles as Captain Ben
 Philip Traub as Bob
 Madge Evans as Mildred

References

Bibliography
 Goble, Alan. The Complete Index to Literary Sources in Film. Walter de Gruyter, 1999.

External links
 

1914 films
1914 drama films
1910s English-language films
American silent feature films
Silent American drama films
American black-and-white films
Films directed by Jack Pratt
1910s American films
English-language drama films